The Balkan Athletics Championships is a regional athletics competition held between nations from the Balkans and organized by Balkan Athletics. The first games were held in Athens in 1929 as an unofficial event, receiving official sanction the following year.

The competition was not held from 1941 to 1952, although an unofficial Balkan Games was held in 1946 and a Balkan and Central European Games in 1947 involving the same countries plus Hungary. The first women's champions were declared at those events, and a women's programme continued upon the official post-World War II relaunch in 1953.

Champions

100 metres

200 metres

400 metres

800 metres

1500 metres

3000 metres

5000 metres

10,000 metres

Marathon

3000 metres steeplechase

80 metres hurdles

100 metres hurdles

400 metres hurdles

High jump

Pole vault

Long jump

Triple jump

Shot put

Discus throw

Hammer throw

Javelin throw

Triathlon
1947:

Pentathlon

Heptathlon

10,000 metres walk
The Balkan Championships race in 10,000 metres walk was held as a road event in 1988, 1992, and 2000.

20 kilometres walk

4 × 100 metres relay

4 × 400 metres relay

References

Champions 1960–2006
Balkan Championships. GBR Athletics. Retrieved 2021-01-16.

Winners
 List
Balkan Championships
Balkan Championships